Senada Ceman (born 2 January 1995) is a Luxembourger footballer who plays as a midfielder for Dames Ligue 1 club SC Bettembourg and the Luxembourg women's national team.

References

1995 births
Living people
Women's association football midfielders
Luxembourgian women's footballers
Luxembourg women's international footballers